Lusterala is a monotypic, neotropical genus of tortix moths provisionally assigned to tribe Grapholitini of subfamily Olethreutinae, with Lusterala phaseolana as sole species. Genus and species were both described in 2007 by John Wesley Brown and Kenji Nishida. The holotype is conserved at the National Museum of Natural History in Washington, DC.

Behaviour and distribution
Lusterala phaseolana is known from Costa Rica. Its larvae are gall-inductive on their host plant, lima bean (Phaseolus lunatus L.).

References

Grapholitini
Tortricidae genera
Monotypic moth genera